Phantasia is a studio album by Julian Lloyd Webber and Sarah Chang released in 2005 by the EMI label.
It was produced by Andrew Lloyd Webber and John Fraser.

Track listing

 Phantasia - Arranged by Geoffrey Alexander, based on melodies from Andrew Lloyd Webber's The Phantom of the Opera
 The Woman in White Suite - Arranged by Laurence Roman

Artists
 Julian Lloyd Webber, Cello
 Sarah Chang, Violin
 The London Orchestra conducted by Simon Lee

References

External links 
 Classic.net Phantasia review
 

2005 albums
The Phantom of the Opera (1986 musical)